Qeshlaq-e Khan Owghlan (also Romanized as Qeshlāq-e Khān Owghlān; also known as Ojāq Qeshlāq, Owjāq Qeshlāq, and Qeshlāq-e Khān Oghlān) is a village in Qeshlaq-e Jonubi Rural District, Qeshlaq Dasht District, Bileh Savar County, Ardabil Province, Iran. At the 2006 census, its population was 80, in 21 families.

References 

Towns and villages in Bileh Savar County